Dominic "Mimi" Barona (born 10 February 1991) is an Ecuadorian surfer. She is regarded as one of the prominent surfers in Ecuador. Her brother Israel Barona is also a surfer who represents Ecuador at international level. She is the first surfer from Ecuador to have competed at the Olympics.

Career 
Barona pursued her interest in surfing at the age of 13 after being influenced by her older brother Israel. Little by little, she began to follow the Alas circuit in Peru, then in Costa Rica and Panama. In 2014, she claimed second place at the ISA 50TH World Surfing Games which was held in Punta Rocas, Peru. In this event, Mimi achieved the highest score in a round in the history of the event. However, Peruvian surfer Analí Gómez clinched victory with a score of 12.86 while Mimi finished with the score of 12.53.

Dominic was the flagbearer for Ecuador during the 2016 Bolivarian Beach Games and also claimed a gold medal in the women's open shortboard event during the 2016 Bolivarian Games. She became the South American champion of the World Surf League in 2018 with a total score of 4,310 followed by Melanie Giunia of Peru who had a final score of 3,260 units. She also emerged as the winner of the 2019 Corona Pro Surf Circuit, organized by the National Surf Organization in Puerto Rico.

She represented Ecuador at the 2019 Pan American Games and secured a silver medal in the women's open surf whereas Daniella Rosas of Peru clinched the gold medal. She also notably became the first Ecuadorian surfer to win a medal in surfing at the Pan American Games. She also qualified to compete at the 2020 Summer Olympics where surfing was included for the first time in Olympics.

She preferred to compete at the 2019 Pan American Games over the World Surf League tour events despite the WSL tour events were also considered as Olympic qualifying events. However, she was eligible to compete at the delayed 2020 Tokyo Olympics following her medal success at the 2019 Pan American Games. She represented Ecuador at the 2020 Summer Olympics which also marked her debut appearance at the Olympics. She was also the only Ecuadorian surfer to participate at the 2020 Summer Olympics. She was eliminated from the round 2 of the women's shortboard event.

References

External links
 

1991 births
Living people
Ecuadorian surfers
World Surf League surfers
Surfers at the 2020 Summer Olympics
Olympic surfers of Ecuador
Pan American Games silver medalists for Ecuador
Pan American Games medalists in surfing
Surfers at the 2019 Pan American Games
Medalists at the 2019 Pan American Games
People from Santa Elena Province
21st-century Ecuadorian women